The St. Johns Racquet Center is an indoor tennis facility located in the St. Johns neighborhood of Portland, Oregon. It opened in 1979 and is owned by the city and managed by Portland After-School Tennis & Education (PASTE). It was previously operated by Portland Parks & Recreation.

History
The St. Johns Racquet Center was planned in 1976 but delayed until 1979 after problems with shipment from the manufacturer Hess Building Company. The 27,500 ft. prefabricated building cost US$648,000 (US$ adjusted for inflation) was designed by Richard L. Glassford and Associations and manufactured in the Midwest United States. The total construction cost reached US$883,537 (US$ adjusted for inflation), most of which came from Economic Development Administration, when the building was erected. A failed plan in 1981 called for part of the racquet center be made a roller rink. 

In October 1981, a National Association of Intercollegiate Athletics (NAIA) round robin tournament was held at the racquet center. The maximum capacity of the building in accordance to the fire code is 20 people. Threats to close the center came in 1983 from Portland Parks & Recreation commissioner Charles Jordan. Instead the hours of operations were cut. 

A racquetball club known as the "Smashers" was organized at the center in 1984. The center held a table tennis tournament in 1987 and 1988. Plans to allow an private company operate the center were drawn up in 1994 but were quickly abandoned. A similar plan came up in 2006 and also failed. A plan to tear the center down to construct an apartment building was proposed in 2007 but was shelved and it was never recommended again. The center hosts several Portland Interscholastic League tennis matches. It is currently operated by Portland After-School Tennis & Education (PASTE).

See also
 List of sports venues in Portland, Oregon

References

External links
 St Johns Racquet Center — PortlandOregon.gov
 Portland After-School Tennis & Education (PASTE) — St. Johns
 St Johns Racquet Club — TennisPoint.com

1979 establishments in Oregon
Sports venues completed in 1979
Sports venues in Portland, Oregon
Tennis venues in the United States
Racquetball in the United States
Parks in Portland, Oregon
Buildings and structures in St. Johns, Portland, Oregon
Prefabricated buildings